Capsus ater is a species of bug in the Miridae family that likely originated in North America, but that is now found in Europe and across the Palearctic to Siberia and in North America. 

Capsus ater is found in dry to moderately moist, open to partially shaded habitats  In the Alps it rises to over 2000 meters above sea level. The bugs live on different grasses (Poaceae) and do not seem to have any particular preference for certain species or genera.

References

Hemiptera of Europe
Bugs described in 1758
Taxa named by Carl Linnaeus
Articles containing video clips
Mirini